Triannon may refer to

Grand Trianon, in France
Petit Trianon, in France
The Triannon, an alien race in the Star Trek: Enterprise episode "Chosen Realm"